Mahesh Mangaonkar (born 23 March 1994 in Mumbai) is a professional squash player who represented India. He reached a career-high world ranking of World No. 44 in January 2015. He won the prestigious British Junior Open Under-15 category in 2009.

Mahesh Mangaonkar won the IMET Open 2013 in the Slovak capital Bratislava. He is the first Indian squash player to win the IMET Open.
He was a part of the Indian team, who won the gold medal at the 2014 Asian Games held at Incheon

References

External links 
 
 

1994 births
Living people
Indian male squash players
Racket sportspeople from Mumbai
Asian Games medalists in squash
Asian Games gold medalists for India
Asian Games bronze medalists for India
Squash players at the 2014 Asian Games
Squash players at the 2018 Asian Games
Medalists at the 2014 Asian Games
Medalists at the 2018 Asian Games
Competitors at the 2013 World Games